Northern America may refer to:

Northern America, a northerly region of the Americas.
Northern America (WGSRPD), the botanical continent defined in the World Geographical Scheme for Recording Plant Distributions
 An English translation of Mexico's first official name (América Septentrional), so entitled in the Solemn Act of the Declaration of Independence of Northern America — see Toponymy of Mexico.
Northern United States, a region of the lower 48 of the United States of America near the Canada–United States border.

See also
Northern American (disambiguation)
North America
Americas (terminology)